Judgement Day is a 1986 role-playing game adventure, the first one published by Games Workshop for Judge Dredd: The Role-Playing Game, which itself is based on the comic Judge Dredd.

Plot summary
Judgement Day is an adventure set in 2018 that takes place in both Mega-City One and on the prison moon Titan orbiting Jupiter. The evil Judge Cal, former tyrant ruler of Mega-City One, had his personality saved on a microchip before his death. The players must find the microchip and prevent it from being used, which would lead to the return of Judge Cal and his nefarious plans.  

The adventure is divided into four chapters:
 A Shot in the Dark: The players discover the body of a med-judge in the Labyrinth district
 The Killer Fleas: The players try to visit the household of the dead med-judge, now quarantined due to an infestation of killer insects.
 Trouble on Titan: The players travel to the prison moon of Titan
 Cal Has Risen: The players try to protect Chief Justice McGruder from Cal.

Publication history
Games Workshop (GW) first published Judge Dredd: The Role-Playing Game in 1985. The following year, GW released the game's first adventure, Judgement Day. The 32-page book was written by Marcus L. Rowland, with a cover by Brett Ewins. It also included 16 pages of player aids and cardstock miniatures of non-player characters.

Reception
Jason Kingsley reviewed Judgement Day for White Dwarf #75, giving it an overall rating of 9 out of 10, and stated that "Judgment Day is a solidly produced, value-for-money scenario, with well realised plot lines and individualised NPCs. Its plot is clever though slightly off-beat, but very much in keeping with the rest of Judge Dredd's world."

References

Judge Dredd: The Role-Playing Game
Role-playing game supplements introduced in 1986
Science fiction role-playing game adventures